Delano Wayne Hollis (born 17 September 1969, in Bermuda) is a former Bermudian cricketer. He was a right-handed batsman and a right-arm off-break bowler. He played three List A matches for Bermuda in the 1997 Red Stripe Bowl, also representing them in the 1997 ICC Trophy.

References

External links
Cricket Archive profile
Cricinfo profile

1969 births
Living people
Bermudian cricketers